Łazy  is a village in the administrative district of Gmina Łuków, within Łuków County, Lublin Voivodeship, in eastern Poland.

The village has an approximate population of 1,030.

Henryk Pachulski the pianist and composer was born here, as was his elder brother Władysław Pachulski, also a musician who became the son-in-law of Pyotr Ilyich Tchaikovsky's patroness Nadezhda von Meck and played a significant role in the breakdown of their relationship.

References

Villages in Łuków County